Fallston is the name of several places in the United States:

Fallston, Maryland
Fallston, North Carolina
Fallston, Pennsylvania